Kampong Cham Football Club is a football club based in Kampong Cham Province, Cambodia. The club was invited by the FFC to compete in the 2019 Cambodian League, the top division of Cambodian football.

Current squad 

(Captain)

References

External links 

Football clubs in Cambodia
Sport in Phnom Penh